Rosaryville is an unincorporated area and census-designated place (CDP) in Prince George's County, Maryland, United States, located south of Cinton and Upper Marlboro beside U.S. Route 301. Per the 2020 census, the population was 11,548. including housing developments and rural open space. It was named for a local Roman Catholic church.  Close to Rosaryville are the Marlton housing development, Maryland Veterans Cemetery, the Southern Maryland Farmers Market, and Rosaryville State Park.

History
His Lordship's Kindness was listed on the National Register of Historic Places and as a National Historic Landmark in 1970.

Geography
Rosaryville is located at  (38.767664, −76.835568).

Demographics

2020 census

Note: the US Census treats Hispanic/Latino as an ethnic category. This table excludes Latinos from the racial categories and assigns them to a separate category. Hispanics/Latinos can be of any race.

2000 Census
As of the census of 2000, there were 12,322 people, 4,112 households, and 3,367 families residing in the CDP. The racial makeup of the CDP was 34.13% White, 59.57% African American, 0.64% Native American, 2.67% Asian, 0.11% Pacific Islander, 0.63% from other races, and 2.25% from two or more races. Hispanic or Latino of any race were 2.12% of the population.

There were 4,112 households, out of which 40.5% had children under the age of 18 living with them, 64.7% were married couples living together, 12.6% had a female householder with no husband present, and 18.1% were non-families. 14.3% of all households were made up of individuals, and 3.6% had someone living alone who was 65 years of age or older. The average household size was 2.99 and the average family size was 3.29.

In the CDP, the population was spread out, with 28.0% under the age of 18, 6.8% from 18 to 24, 32.3% from 25 to 44, 25.8% from 45 to 64, and 7.1% who were 65 years of age or older. The median age was 37 years. For every 100 females, there were 95.4 males. For every 100 females age 18 and over, there were 92.4 males.

The median income for a household in the CDP was $79,715, and the median income for a family was $85,225. Males had a median income of $48,776 versus $41,843 for females. The per capita income for the CDP was $27,817. About 1.7% of families and 2.9% of the population were below the poverty line, including 3.3% of those under age 18 and none of those age 65 or over.

Government
Prince George's County Police Department District 5 Station in Clinton CDP serves the community.

Education
Rosaryville residents are assigned to schools in Prince George's County Public Schools:

Elementary schools serving sections of the 2010 CDP include Melwood Elementary School and Rosaryville Elementary School.

Most residents are zoned to James Madison Middle School, with some zoned to Gwynn Park Middle School.

Dr. Henry A. Wise Jr. High School and Frederick Douglass High School serve sections of the CDP.

References

Census-designated places in Prince George's County, Maryland
Census-designated places in Maryland
Washington metropolitan area